Attilio Caja (born 20 May 1961 in Pavia, Italy) is an Italian professional basketball coach who is head coach for Scafati Basket of the Italian Lega Basket Serie A (LBA).

Coaching career
He was head-coach of the Italian national basketball team in 1997, and led them to the silver medal at the 1997 Mediterranean Games.

His first time as a head coach was with Pallacanestro Pavia in 1992.

Since 2016 he is the head-coach of the Italian basketball team Pallacanestro Varese.

In 2021 he signed a contract with Reggio Emilia to replace Antimo Martino.

On November 9, 2022, he signed with Scafati Basket of the Italian Lega Basket Serie A (LBA).

Honors and titles
Head coach
Italian Supercup: 1
Virtus Bologna: 2000
LBA Best Coach: 1
Virtus Bologna: 1996

References

External links 
 Attilio Caja at legabasket.it

1961 births
Living people
Basket Rimini Crabs coaches
Italian basketball coaches
Olimpia Milano coaches
Pallacanestro Varese coaches
Pallacanestro Virtus Roma coaches
Pallalcesto Amatori Udine coaches
S.S. Basket Napoli coaches
Sportspeople from Pavia
Vanoli Basket coaches
Victoria Libertas Pesaro coaches